Troy Spring State Park is a Florida State Park, located approximately six miles north of Branford, off US 27. It contains one of the state's 33 first magnitude springs.

At the bottom of the Troy Spring is the sunken Confederate sidewheel paddle steamer Madison, which had been owned and captained by James Felix Tucker. Tucker scuttled Madison in September 1863 to prevent her from falling into Union hands during the American Civil War.

Gallery

References

External links

 

State parks of Florida
Parks in Lafayette County, Florida
Parks in Suwannee County, Florida